Bruno Felipe Serbena Lapa (born 10 May 1997) is a Brazilian footballer who currently plays for Memphis 901 in the USL Championship.

Career

Youth and college 
Lapa played with Brazilian side Athletico Paranaense from 2008 to 2013, before moving to the United States to play at the Montverde Academy in Florida from 2014

In 2016, Lapa began playing college soccer at Wake Forest University. At Wake Forest, Lapa made 80 appearances, scoring 23 goals and tallying 15 assists. In his junior year, Lapa was named the 2018 ACC Midfielder of the Year, was a MAC Hermann Trophy Semi-finalist, and a United Soccer Coaches and College Soccer News First Team All-American.

Whilst at college, Lapa played in the USL League Two for both SIMA Águilas in 2018 and North Carolina Fusion U23 in 2019.

Professional

Birmingham Legion
Lapa signed his first professional contract with USL Championship side Birmingham Legion on 14 February 2020. He made his professional debut on 15 July 2020 against rivals Memphis 901, where he scored two goals and assisted the third in a 3-0 win.

Following the 2020 season, where Lapa was named as an All-League First Team selection, Lapa signed a multi-year contract with Birmingham. On 2 August 2022, Lapa was named USL Championship Player of the Week for Week 21 of the 2022 season after scoring the first hat trick in Birmingham Legion history against Loudoun United.

Memphis 901
On 1 February 2023, Lapa made the move to USL Champpionship side Memphis 901, signing a multi-year deal.

References

External links 
 Bruno Lapa - Men's Soccer Wake Forest bio
 Bruno Lapa | uslchampionship.com USL Championship bio
 Bruno Lapa Birmingham Legion bio

1997 births
All-American men's college soccer players
Association football midfielders
Birmingham Legion FC players
Brazilian expatriate sportspeople in the United States
Brazilian footballers
Expatriate soccer players in the United States
Footballers from Curitiba
Living people
Memphis 901 FC players
Montverde Academy alumni
North Carolina Fusion U23 players
SIMA Águilas players
USL Championship players
USL League Two players
Wake Forest Demon Deacons men's soccer players